Pelican of London is a sail training ship based in the United Kingdom. Built in 1948 as Pelican she served as an Arctic trawler and then a coastal trading vessel named Kadett until 1995. In 2007 an extended conversion to a sail-training ship was completed.

History
Built in 1948 in Le Havre, France, Pelican was originally a double-beam Arctic fishing trawler, one of five identical ships built in Chantiers et Ateliers Augustin Normand, the shipyard founded by the Normand family. She was sold to a Norwegian firm and spent the next 19 years fishing the Arctic.

In 1968 Pelican was converted from a trawler to a coaster. Her owners renamed her Kadett. She remained Kadett for 27 years until in 1995 she again changed hands.

She was bought by ex-Naval Commander Graham Neilson who transformed her into a tall ship and renamed her Pelican of London. He had already undertaken a similar project with the TS Astrid. Working in Portland Harbour, Dorset, UK, Neilson and his team spent 12 years stripping back the trawler and rebuilding her as a main mast barquentine. A moderate rearrangement of the mainmast standing rigging enables the yards to be braced to half the traditional angle when on the wind, giving the ship unusual windward ability for a square rigger. A trainee on the ship won the 2010 Torbay cup.

As of 2012, Pelican of London is operated as a sail training vessel for young people, by the charity Adventure Under Sail. Sail Training International ranks it is a Class A tall ship. In autumn of 2012, Pelican of London was scheduled to become the first sailing ship in a century to make a trans-Atlantic voyage from the Port of Liverpool with fare-paying passengers. It's not clear if this voyage took place. Pelican has completed a number of transatlantic voyages.

Pelican of London was advertised for sale in 2012, valued at £2.45 million.

In June 2015 it was noted as an attendee of Tall Ships Belfast 2015.

Since 2018 the TS Pelican of London is regularly sailing from Europe to the Caribbean and back in cooperation with the German project Ocean College. The voyage takes place in the Winter month between October and April.

In 2021 the ship embarked upon a thirteen-week research cruise organised by charity City to Sea and environmental research group Darwin200 to survey the extent of plastic pollution in UK coastal waters.

References

External links 
 
 Photos of Pelican
Pelican of London leaving southwick (worthing herald article)

1948 ships
Ships built in France
Fishing vessels of Norway
Merchant ships of Norway
Ships of the United Kingdom
Sail training
Training ships
Sail training ships
Barquentines
Tall ships